Kylie Nicole Hutson (born November 27, 1987) is an American track and field athlete who competes in the pole vault. She was the national champion in the event in 2011 and represented the United States at the World Championships in Athletics in 2011 and 2013. She won four NCAA collegiate titles while at Indiana State University. Her personal records are  indoors and  outdoors.

Career

Early life and college
Born to Kevin and Susan Hutson in Terre Haute, Indiana, she attended Terre Haute North Vigo High School and took part in diving, volleyball and track and field while there. She began to study exercise science at Indiana State University in 2006 and competed collegiately in the pole vault for the Indiana State Sycamores. In her freshman year she won both Missouri Valley Conference titles indoors and outdoors and reached the NCAA Championships. She was a finalist indoors and outdoors at the NCAA meets and also competed in qualifying at the 2008 United States Olympic Trials.

In her final two years at Indiana State she extended her regional undefeated streak and took two consecutive victories at both the NCAA Women's Division I Indoor Track and Field Championships and the NCAA Outdoor Championships. She graduated in 2011 as the school record holder at  outdoors and  indoors.

World Championships
She took straight wins at the Mt SAC Relays, Kansas Relays and Drake Relays then competed on the 2011 IAAF Diamond League circuit, taking fifth at the Prefontaine Classic and runner-up at the Adidas Grand Prix in New York. As a result, she was given her first national selection, though she competed in qualifying only at the 2011 World Championships in Athletics while Suhr took fourth.

Returning to international competition, she failed to record a valid mark at the 2013 World Championships in Athletics.

Hutson competed frequently on the professional circuit in 2014, but her performances declined a little, as she was third nationally indoors and sixth outdoors.

International competitions

National titles
USA Outdoor Track and Field Championships
Pole vault: 2011
NCAA Women's Division I Outdoor Track and Field Championships
Pole vault: 2009, 2010
NCAA Women's Division I Indoor Track and Field Championships
Pole vault: 2009, 2010

See also
List of pole vault national champions (women)

References

External links

Living people
1987 births
Sportspeople from Terre Haute, Indiana
Track and field athletes from Indiana
American female pole vaulters
World Athletics Championships athletes for the United States
Indiana State Sycamores women's track and field athletes
USA Outdoor Track and Field Championships winners